Marco V (born Marco Verkuylen; , 3 April 1967, Heeswijk-Dinther) is a Dutch electronic music DJ.

Discography

Albums

Singles and extended plays
 1998: "The Vibes (Want You Back)"
 1999: "The Message"
 1999: "Heaven's Here"
 1999: "Vision Phase 1 (of 3)"
 2000: "Vision Phase 2 (of 3)"
 2000: "Vision Phase 3 (of 3)"
 2002: "Simulated"
 2002: "Con:fusion Album Sampler Pt. 1"
 2003: "Con:fusion Album Sampler Pt. 2"
 2004: "Automanual"
 2005: "More Than a Life Away"
 2005: "Second Bite"
 2006: "False Light"
 2006: "200V - UK EP"
 2008: "Dudak"
 2008: "Sessions"
 2009: "Unprepared"
 2009: "Solitary Confinement (Remixed)"
 2010: "Reaver"
 2010: "Provider"
 2010: "Contour"
 2011: "Groove Machine" (with Paul Oakenfold)
 2011: "Sticker"
 2011: "Be There in the Morning" (with Felix Maginn)
 2011: "Kalevala" (with Russell G)
 2011: "Rokker"
 2011: "Essence" (with Damien William)
 2012: "Analogital"
 2012: "Scream" (with Marcel Woods)
 2012: "Solid Sounds"
 2012: "GOHF"
 2012: "Engine Is More Than a Life Away" (with De Leon & Gum Me)
 2012: "10 PM"
 2012: "TGV"
 2013: "Walhalla"
 2013: "Hypergenic Supersonic Futuristic Monophonic "
 2013: "Quake" (with Alex Guesta & Stefano Pain)
 2013: "Frozen Heart" (with Christian Burns)
 2013: "Naneo" (with Damian William)
 2013: "Krezy"
 2014: "Jaguar" (with Thomas Newson)
 2015: "Squeezed" (with Brian Cross)
 2017: "Lost World Anthem 2017" (with Signum)
 2017: "Aranck"

References

External links

 Marco V's full Discography at Discogs.com
 Marco V's home page

1967 births
Living people
V, Marco
Dutch dance musicians
Dutch house musicians
Dutch DJs
V, Marco
People from Bernheze
Electronic dance music DJs